Michele Collocolo (born 8 November 1999) is an Italian football player. He plays for Ascoli.

Club career
He made his professional Serie C debut for Cosenza on 7 May 2016 in a game against Ischia.

On 12 July 2021, he signed a three-year contract with Serie B club Ascoli. He made his Serie B debut for Ascoli on 22 August 2021 against Cosenza.

References

External links
 
 

1999 births
Sportspeople from Taranto
Footballers from Apulia
Living people
Italian footballers
Association football midfielders
Cosenza Calcio players
F.C. Francavilla players
Rende Calcio 1968 players
Cesena F.C. players
Ascoli Calcio 1898 F.C. players
Serie B players
Serie C players
Serie D players